Morgan Run may refer to:

Morgan Run, Ohio, an unincorporated community
Morgan Run (Youghiogheny River tributary), a stream in Fayette County, Pennsylvania
Morgan Run Natural Environment Area, a protected area in Maryland